Oxycera nigricornis, the delicate soldier, is a European species of soldier fly.

Description
Vein RH5 is simple. The thorax is very bare and shining in both sexes; in the females, longitudinal stripes are joined anteriorly to large  patches on the nototpleuron.

Biology
The habitat is wetlands, marshes.  Adults are found June to August.

Distribution
Taiga and forest zones of the European part of the USSR and Siberia, northern Kazakhstan, Primor'e Territory. North and Central belts of Western Europe, northern Mongolia.

References

External links
Images representing Oxycera nigricornis at Bold

Stratiomyidae
Diptera of Europe
Insects described in 1811